Passandrophloeus is a genus of beetles in the family Laemophloeidae, containing the following species:

 Passandrophloeus belli Grouvelle
 Passandrophloeus ditomoides Grouvelle
 Passandrophloeus falcidens Grouvelle
 Passandrophloeus glabriculus Grouvelle
 Passandrophloeus spinosus Grouvelle

References

Cucujoidea genera
Laemophloeidae